Ludwig Alberto (born 15 May 1962) is a Curaçao professional football manager.

Career
In November and December 2012 he worked with the Curaçao national under-20 football team. From March 2012 to June 2014, he was head coach of the Curaçao national football team.

References

External links
Profile at Soccerway.com
Profile at Soccerpunter.com
Profile at Footballdatabase.eu

1962 births
Living people
Curaçao football managers
Curaçao national football team managers
Place of birth missing (living people)